Monte Velino is a mountain (2,487 m)  in the province of L'Aquila, Abruzzo, central  Italy, part of the Abruzzo Apennines. Located nearby the boundary with Lazio, between the Fucino plain and the Aterno, Salto and Velino rivers' valleys, it is the highest peak in the Sirente-Velino Regional Park, the highest point in the Tiber basin, and the third highest peak in the whole Apennines.

The massif is included in the Sirente-Velino Regional Park. It is characterized by a rough and desertic appearance, although specialized vegetation is widespread. Fauna includes Italian wolf and wild boar and the Marsican brown bear.

See also
Monte Sirente

Mountains of Abruzzo
Two-thousanders of Italy